Sand Point is a cape at the entrance to the northwest arm of Lake Temagami in geographic Joan Township in the municipality of Temagami, Nipissing District in Northeastern Ontario, Canada. The cape has a large sandy beach on its south side, and a small campground on its east side. The cape lies within the Skyline Reserve ecological reserve.

References

Other map sources:

Beaches of Ontario
Landforms of Temagami